Andresia may refer to:
 Andresia (cnidarian), a genus of cnidarians in the family Andresiidae
 Andresia, a genus of plants in the family Ericaceae, synonym of Cheilotheca